A Uniform Residential Appraisal Report or URAR is one of the most common forms used in United States real estate appraisals.  It was created to allow for standard reporting and analysis of single-family dwellings or single-family dwellings with an "accessory unit".  It is also suitable for a building in a planned unit development (PUD) but is not meant to be used for appraisals of manufactured homes or condos.

The most current incarnation of the URAR is the "Fannie Mae Form 1004" updated for March 2005.  It is considered a full appraisal with all three approaches to value, cost approach, sales comparison approach, and income approach.

Requirements
The report requires an interior and exterior inspection of the subject property.
A street map that shows the location of the subject property and of all comparable properties that the appraiser used.
An exterior building sketch of the improvements that indicates the dimensions.
Clear, descriptive photographs of the subject property and comparable sales used.

Parts of the URAR
Some of the sections of a URAR include but are not limited to:

Subject: Basic information such as the address, legal description, owner's and/or borrower's names.  The client is also identified here.
Contract: Information on the contract for sale is entered here for appraisals in which a change of ownership is about to occur.
Site: Data on the size, shape, zoning, and access to utilities as well as FEMA flood-zone information
Improvements: Physical characteristics of the property such as age, materials, and condition
Sales comparison approach: The grid analysis, this is where the property being appraised is compared to recent sales of other properties.
Reconciliation:-
Income approach: 
Cost approach: 
Additional Addendum:
Signature Section: 
Subject Interior and Exterior Photos:
Comparable Photos:
Building Sketch:
Location Map:
Flood Map:
Plat Map:
Aerial Map:
license:
E&O:

References
"Uniform Residential Appraisal Report"

External links
Landlord Reviews

Real estate valuation